A seaside resort is a town, village, or hotel that serves as a vacation resort and is located on a coast. Sometimes the concept includes an aspect of official accreditation based on the satisfaction of certain requirements, such as in the German Seebad. Where a beach is the primary focus for tourists, it may be called a beach resort.

History

Seaside resorts have existed since antiquity. In Roman times, the town of Baiae, by the Tyrrhenian Sea in Italy, was a resort for those who were sufficiently prosperous. Barcola in northern Italy, with its Roman luxury villas, is considered a special example of ancient leisure culture by the sea. Mersea Island, in Essex, England was a seaside holiday destination for wealthy Romans living in Colchester.

The development of the beach as a popular leisure resort from the mid-19th century was the first manifestation of what is now the global tourist industry. The first seaside resorts were opened in the 18th century for the aristocracy, who began to frequent the seaside as well as the then fashionable spa towns, for recreation and health. One of the earliest such seaside resorts was Scarborough in Yorkshire during the 1720s; it had been a popular spa town since a stream of acidic water was discovered running from one of the cliffs to the south of the town in the 17th century. The first rolling bathing machines were introduced by 1735.

In 1793, Heiligendamm in Mecklenburg, Germany was founded as the first seaside resort of the European continent, which successfully attracted Europe's aristocracy to the Baltic Sea.

The opening of the resort in Brighton and its reception of royal patronage from King George IV extended the seaside as a resort for health and pleasure to the much larger London market, and the beach became a centre for upper-class pleasure and frivolity. This trend was praised and artistically elevated by the new romantic ideal of the picturesque landscape; Jane Austen's unfinished novel Sanditon is an example of that. Later, Queen Victoria's long-standing patronage of the Isle of Wight and Ramsgate in Kent ensured that a seaside residence was considered as a highly fashionable possession for those wealthy enough to afford more than one home.

Seaside resorts for the middle and working classes

The extension of this form of leisure to the middle and working classes began with the development of the railways in the 1840s; they offered cheap travel to fast-growing resort towns. In particular, the branch line to the small seaside town of Blackpool from Poulton-le-Fylde led to a sustained economic and demographic boom. A sudden influx of visitors arriving by rail motivated entrepreneurs to build accommodation and create new attractions, leading to more visitors and rapid growth throughout the 1850s and 1860s.

The growth was intensified by the practice among the Lancashire cotton mill owners of closing the factories for a week every year to service and repair machinery. These became known as wakes weeks. Each town's mills would close for a different week, allowing Blackpool to manage a steady and reliable stream of visitors over a prolonged period in the summer. A prominent feature of the resort was the promenade and the pleasure piers, where an eclectic variety of performances vied for the people's attention. In 1863, the North Pier in Blackpool was completed, rapidly becoming a centre of attraction for elite visitors. Central Pier was completed in 1868, with a theatre and a large open-air dance floor.

Many popular beach resorts were equipped with bathing machines, because even the all-covering beachwear of the period was considered immodest.

By the end of the century the English coastline had over 100 large resort towns, some with populations exceeding 50,000.

Expansion around the world

The development of the seaside resort abroad was stimulated by the well-developed English love of the beach. The French Riviera on the Mediterranean had already become a destination for the British upper class by the end of the 18th century. In 1864, the first railway to Nice was completed, making the Riviera accessible to visitors from all over Europe. By 1874, foreign residents in Nice, mostly British, numbered 25,000. The coastline became renowned for attracting the royalty of Europe, including Queen Victoria and King Edward VII.

In the United States, early seaside resorts in the late 1800s catered to the wealthy, including city businessmen. Cape May, New Jersey became one of the first coastal resorts in the United States, when regular steamboat traffic on the Delaware River began after the War of 1812. Early visitors to Cape May included Henry Clay in 1847, and Abraham Lincoln in 1849. By 1880, Henry Flagler had extended several rail lines southward down the US Atlantic coastline, enticing northern upper-class families south to subtropical Florida. The Florida East Coast Railway brought northern tourists to St. Augustine in greater numbers, and by 1887 Flagler began to build two large ornate hotels in St. Augustine, the 540-room Ponce de Leon Hotel and the Hotel Alcazar, and bought the Casa Monica Hotel the next year.

Continental European attitudes towards gambling and nudity tended to be more lax than in Britain, and British and French entrepreneurs were quick to exploit the possibilities. In 1863, the Prince of Monaco, Charles III and François Blanc, a French businessman, arranged for steamships and carriages to take visitors from Nice to Monaco, where large luxury hotels, gardens and casinos were built. The place was renamed Monte Carlo. Commercial seabathing also spread to other areas of the United States and parts of the British Empire such as Australia, where surfing became popular in the early 20th century. By the 1970s cheap and affordable air travel was the catalyst for the growth of a truly global tourism market.

Recreational fishing and leisure boat pursuits have recently become very lucrative, and traditional fishing villages are often well positioned to take advantage of this. For example, Destin, on the coast of Florida, has evolved from an artisanal fishing village into a seaside resort dedicated to tourism with a large fishing fleet of recreational charter boats. The tourist appeal of fishing villages has become so big that the Korean government is purpose-building 48 fishing villages for their tourist drawing power.

Around the world

Australia

Belgium 
Seaside resorts on the Flemish coast of West-Vlaanderen exist at the famous Knokke, Ostend and also De Panne and coastal towns along the North Sea served by the coastal tramway Kusttram run by De Lijn.

Bulgaria

Croatia 

There are many seaside resorts on the jagged coastline of Croatia, including several on its islands, which have been popular for many years. Examples include:

Biograd na Moru
Cres
Jablanac
Krk
Lopar
Omiš
Omišalj
Opatija
Porec
Šibenik
Trogir

Cyprus 
Ayia Napa
Coral Bay
Larnaca
Latchi
Limassol
Paphos
Pissouri
Polis
Protaras

Denmark 
Blåvand
Hornbæk
Marielyst
Skagen
Tisvildeleje

Estonia 
Haapsalu
Kuressaare
Narva-Jõesuu
Pärnu

Finland 

Hailuoto
Hanko
Kalajoki
Mariehamn
Naantali
Oulu
Yyteri

France 

With three long coastlines, France has many seaside resorts on its various coasts; for specific towns in each region, see the following articles:

 Côte Bleue on the Mediterranean Sea
 Côte d'Argent on the Bay of Biscay
 Côte de Lumière on the Bay of Biscay
 Côte des Landes, a section of the Côte d'Argent
 Côte d'Opale on the English Channel
 Côte Fleurie on the English Channel
 French Riviera (Côte d'Azur) on the Mediterranean

Georgia 

 Batumi
 Gagra
 Kobuleti
 Kvariati 
 New Athos
 Pitsunda
 Sukhumi

Germany 

 

Germany is known for its traditional seaside resorts on the Baltic Sea and the North Sea coasts, mainly established in the 19th century. In German they are called Seebad ("Sea Spa") or Seeheilbad, sometimes with Ostsee- or Nordsee- as prefixes for the respective coastline.

The most prestigious resorts can be found along the Baltic coastline, including the islands of Rugia and Usedom. They often feature a unique architectural style called resort architecture. The coast of Mecklenburg and Western Pomerania alone has an overall length of 2000 km and is nicknamed German Riviera. Heiligendamm in Mecklenburg, established in 1793, is the oldest seaside resort in Germany and continental Europe.

Most important coastal areas with seaside resorts in Germany:
 Baltic Sea: islands of Fehmarn, Hiddensee, Rügen, Usedom; Mecklenburg coast, Rostock, peninsula of Fischland, Darss and Zingst
 North Sea: East Frisian Islands and North Frisian Islands

Selection of German seaside resorts along the Baltic Sea coastline:
 
At the North Sea coastline:

Greece 

Greece, renowned as a summer destination, features a large amount of seaside resorts. Some of them are listed below:

India
India has a long coastline and hence has numerous beaches and resort towns. Beaches were already a popular tourist destination for the kings and the masses alike especially in South India where the Dravidian Empires built large temples near the seashore. Beaches are also associated with Hindu rituals where pilgrims from different parts of India go for worshipping rituals. The sun rise and Sunset are also associated with Hindu traditions which are considered sacred my many Hindu communities and there are festivals to celebrate the sunset and sunrise. A major example of such festivals is Chhath Puja. The British Raj also contributed in the development of Beach Resorts where Europeans used to visit during the harsh and cold winter of Europe.

Major sea beaches can be found in large coastal cities of India like Mumbai and Chennai. The Marina Beach in Chennai is the longest unnatural beach in India. Apart from that, Juhu Beach in Mumbai and Kovalam Beach in Trivandrum are also famous. Beach resorts of Puri, Vishakhapatnam, Kochi, Kannur, Tuticorin, Mahabalipuram and Kanyakumari are equally famous.

In the recent years, Goa has become a hotspot for beach resorts and hotels. Goa has numerous beaches and is very near to Mumbai and Pune and not very far from Bengaluru and Chennai making is a favourite destination for many. Goa is also a destination for Russian tourists.

The archipelago of Andaman and Nicobar Islands and Lakshadweep are also famous for beach resorts. Other beach resorts in India includes:
 Digha
 Bakkhali
 Sagar Island
 Kovalam
 Kollam
 Calangute
 Canacona
 Juhu
 Puri
 Visakhapatnam
 Karaikal
 Vodarevu
 buddhabeach
 buddhabeachresorts.com
 Chirala

Iceland 

 Nauthólsvík

Ireland 

The 'Irish Riviera' on the South Coast of Ireland features the seaside resorts of Youghal, Ardmore, Dungarvan, Cóbh and Ballycotton, all set close to the south coast of Ireland. Youghal has been a favoured holiday destination for over 100 years, situated on the banks of the River Blackwater as it reaches the sea. Youghal is well known for its beaches, having been, until 2008, the only town in the Republic of Ireland with two beaches awarded E.U. Blue Flag status. Dungarvan is a seaside market town beneath the mountains in the centre of the Irish south coast. Kinsale is often described as a food lover's and yachting town, with a diverse range of restaurants, as well as a large and active creative community with numerous art galleries and record and book shops.

Seaside resorts in the East of Ireland developed after the introduction of rail travel. The Dublin and Kingstown Railway introduced day-trippers from Dublin to Kingstown (now Dún Laoghaire) in South Dublin, and the coastal town became Ireland's first seaside resort. Other South Dublin towns and villages such as Sandycove, Dalkey and Killiney grew as seaside resorts when the rail network was expanded. Since the opening of Bray Daly Station in 1852, the County Wicklow coastal town of Bray has become the largest seaside resort on the East Coast of Ireland. The town of Greystones, five miles south of Bray, also grew as a seaside resort when the railway line was extended in 1855. Other seaside resorts include Courtown and  Rosslare Strand in County Wexford.

Ulster has a number of seaside resorts, such as Portrush, situated on the north coast, with its two beaches and a world-famous golf course, Royal Portrush Golf Club.  Other Ulster seaside resorts are Newcastle, located on the east coast at the foot of the Mourne Mountains; Ballycastle; Portstewart; Rathmullan; Bundoran and Bangor. Bangor Marina is one of the largest in Ireland and the marina has on occasion been awarded the Blue Flag for attention to environmental issues.

The main seaside towns in the west of Ireland are in Clare; the largest are Lahinch and Kilkee. Lahinch is a popular surfing location.

Like British resorts, many seaside towns in Ireland have turned to other entertainment industries. Larger resorts such as Bray or Portrush host air shows, while most resorts host summer festivals.

Israel 

Israel is a major tourist area. Tourism in Israel is one of the major sources of income, with beautiful beaches, such as those found on the Mediterranean Sea and the Red Sea. Most tourists come from the United States and European countries. Other resorts include:  
 Ashdod
 Ashkelon
 Eilat
 Ein Bokek
 Herzliya
 Tel Aviv

Italy 

Italy is known for its seaside resorts, visited both by Italian and North European tourists. Many of these resorts have a history of tourism which dates back to the 19th century.

Resorts include (among many others):

Japan 
There are seaside resorts in Honshu, Shikoku, and Kyushu, but Okinawa is particularly known for its beaches.

South Korea 
Many seaside resorts are located in Gyeongsang, Jeolla, Chungcheong, Gangwon, Gyeonggi, Incheon, Ulsan and Busan.

Latvia 
Jūrmala
Liepāja
Ventspils

Lithuania 

 Juodkrantė
 Nida
 Palanga
 Pervalka
 Preila
 Šventoji

Malaysia 
 Langkawi
 Batu Ferringhi
 Pangkor
 Port Dickson
 Desaru
 Cherating
 Kuala Terengganu
 Kapas
 Perhentian Islands
 Redang
 Tioman
 Tanjung Aru
 Gaya
 Mabul
 Manukan
 Sipadan
 Bohey Dulang

Malta 

The following are the main resort towns in Malta:
 Northern towns of Mellieħa, St. Paul's Bay, Buġibba and Qawra
 Central towns of Sliema, St. Julian's and Paceville
 Southern towns of Birżebbuġa and Marsascala
 Village of Marsalforn in Gozo
 Parts of the island of Comino

Mexico 

Mexican resorts are popular with many North American residents, with Mexico being the second most visited country in the Americas. Notable resorts on the mainland and Baja Gold Coast and Peninsula include:
 Acapulco
 Baja Mar
 Cabo San Lucas
 Cancún
 Ensenada
 Guaymas
 Ixtapa
 Manzanillo
 Mazatlán
 Playa del Carmen
 Puerto Peñasco
 Puerto Vallarta
 Rosarito Beach
 Tijuana (Playas de Tijuana)
 Veracruz

Netherlands 
There are many seaside resorts on the Dutch coast, chiefly in the provinces of North Holland, South Holland and Zeeland, as well as on the West Frisian Islands.

A selection includes:

Bergen, North Holland
Domburg
Katwijk
Monster, South Holland
Noordwijk
Scheveningen
Zandvoort

New Zealand 
 Kaiteriteri
 Mapua
 Marahau
 Tahunanui                      
 Mount Maunganui

Norway 
 Kristiansand
 Bystranda
 Sola
 Fevik
 Risør

Poland 

Poland's coast on the Baltic Sea includes many traditional seaside resorts established throughout the 18th-20th centuries. In the past the resorts have received mostly domestic tourism, however, since the 1990s, following the opening of Polish borders, the international tourism has grown considerably.
Notable resorts include:
Świnoujście
Międzyzdroje
Dziwnów
Kołobrzeg
Mielno
Darłowo
Ustka
Władysławowo
Chłapowo
Jastarnia
Hel
Sopot

Portugal 

Many European and world tourists visit Portuguese resorts, particularly those on the Algarve and Madeira. Notable resorts include:

Albufeira
Cascais
Estoril
Faro
Figueira da Foz                                                              
Funchal
Lagos
Póvoa de Varzim
Praia da Luz
Quarteira

Romania 
The Romanian Black Sea resorts stretch from the Danube Delta in the north down to the Romanian-Bulgarian border in the south, along 275 kilometers of coastline.

 2 Mai
 Constanța
 Costinești
 Mamaia
 Mangalia
 Năvodari
 Neptun, Romania
 Vama Veche
 Venus, Romania
 Sulina

Russia 

 Anapa
 Gelendzhik
 Lazurnaya Bay
 Sestroretsk
 Sochi, including previously separate settlements Adler, Lazarevskoye, and Dagomys
 Svetlogorsk
 Yantarny
 Zelenogradsk

South Africa

South America 
Notable seaside resorts in South America include Buzios, Camboriú, Florianópolis, Fortaleza, Recife and Salvador de Bahia in Brazil; Mar del Plata in Argentina; Punta del Este and Piriapolis in Uruguay; Viña del Mar in Chile; Cartagena in Colombia; and Salinas in Ecuador.

Spain 

Spanish resorts are popular with many European and world residents. Notable resorts on the mainland and islands include:

Sweden 

 Helsingborg
 Kullaberg
 Falsterbo
 Malmö

Turkey

Ukraine 

Some examples of Ukrainian seaside resort towns are:
 Crimea: Alupka, Alushta, Yevpatoria, Feodosiya, Foros, Gurzuf, Koktebel, Saky, Sudak, Yalta
 Kherson Oblast: Skadovsk
 Mykolaiv Oblast: Ochakov
 Odessa Oblast: Odessa

United Kingdom 

The United Kingdom saw the popularisation of seaside resorts, and nowhere was this more seen than in Blackpool. Blackpool catered for workers from across industrial Northern England, who packed its beaches and promenade. Other northern seaside towns (for example Bridlington, Cleethorpes, Morecambe, Scarborough, Skegness, and Southport) shared in the success of this new concept, especially from trade during wakes weeks. The concept spread rapidly to other British coastal towns, including several on the coast of North Wales, notably Rhyl, and Llandudno, the largest resort in Wales and known as "The Queen of the Welsh Resorts", from as early as 1864.
As the 19th century progressed, British working class day-trippers travelled on organised trips such as railway excursions, or by steamer, for which long piers were erected so that the ships bringing the trade could berth.

Another area notable for its seaside resorts was (and is) the Firth of Clyde, outside Glasgow. Glaswegians would take a ferry "doon the watter" from the city, down the River Clyde, to the Firth's islands and peninsulas and beyond, such as Cowal, Bute, Arran, and Kintyre. Resorts include Rothesay, Lamlash, Whiting Bay, Dunoon, Tighnabruaich, Carrick Castle, Helensburgh, Largs, Millport and Campbeltown. In contrast to many resorts, some on the Firth of Clyde have continued to prosper as middle-class commuter towns.

Some resorts, especially those more southerly such as Hastings, Worthing, Eastbourne, Bournemouth and Brighton were built as new towns or extended by local landowners to appeal to wealthier holidaymakers. Others came about due to their proximity to large urban areas of population, such as Southend-on-Sea, which became increasingly popular with residents of London once rail links were established to it allowing day trips from London. The sunshine and sea air were seen by Victorians as beneficial for health, and resorts such as Ventnor owed their growth to a visit being considered as treatment for chest complaints. Owing to its generally better climate, the south coast has many seaside towns, the most being in Sussex.

In the later 20th century, the popularity of the British seaside resort declined for the same reason that it first flourished: advances in transport. The greater accessibility of foreign holiday destinations, through package holidays and, more recently, European low-cost airlines, makes it easier to holiday abroad. Despite the loyalty of returning holidaymakers, resorts such as Blackpool have struggled to compete against the hotter weather of Southern Europe and the sunbelt in the United States. Now, many symbols of the traditional British resort (holiday camps, end-of-the-pier shows and saucy postcards) are regarded by some as drab and outdated; the skies are imagined to be overcast and the beach windswept. This is not always true; for example Broadstairs in Kent has retained much of its old world charm with Punch and Judy and donkey rides and still remains popular, being only one hour from the M25. Brighton has also seen a fall in visitor numbers in recent years. The city has also experienced a rise in homelessness, especially noticeable on the city streets and in green spaces where tents have been erected. In 2018, Brighton had the second highest homeless population in England, which resulted in the City Council applying to become the first UK city to pass a 'Homeless Bill of Rights'.

Many seaside towns have turned to other entertainment industries, and some of them have a good deal of nightlife. The cinemas and theatres often remain to become host to a number of pubs, bars, restaurants and nightclubs. Most of their entertainment facilities cater to local people, and the beaches are still popular in summer. Although international tourism turned people away from British seaside towns, it also brought in inward foreign travel; many seaside towns offer foreign language schools, the students of which often return to vacation and sometimes to settle. Many people can now afford more time off, and "second holidays" and short breaks, resulting in increased tourism in British seaside towns. Many young people and students can take short holidays and discover the town's nightlife. Many seaside towns have large shopping centres which also attract people from a wide area. Day trippers still come to the coastal towns, but on a more local scale than during the 19th century. 

Many coastal towns are also popular retirement hotspots where older people reside permanently or take short breaks in the autumn months. Other English coastal towns have successfully sought to project a sense of their unique character. In particular, Southwold on the Suffolk coast is an active yet peaceful retirement haven with an emphasis on calmness, quiet countryside and jazz. Weymouth, Dorset offers itself as "the gateway to the Jurassic Coast", Britain's only natural World Heritage Site. Newquay in Cornwall offers itself as the 'surfing capital of Britain', hosting international surfing events on its shores.

Torbay in South Devon is known is also known as the English Riviera. Consisting of the towns of Torquay, Paignton with its pier and Brixham, the bay has 20 beaches and coves along its  coastline, ranging from small secluded coves to the larger promenade-style seafronts of Torquay's Torre Abbey Sands and Paignton Sands.

However, British seaside resorts have faced increasingly stiff competition from sunnier resorts overseas since the 1970s. Largely due to the falling price of air travel under the Conservative government of Margaret Thatcher (elected in 1979), the number of British families who took holidays abroad rose significantly in the 1980s. The decline of British seaside resorts was discussed in the Morrissey song "Everyday Is Like Sunday" where daily life in the resort is likened to the emptiness of streets once associated with the shop closures on Sunday.

United States 

With 3,800 miles (6100 km) of coastline, the USA mainland has hundreds of seaside resorts on three coasts, Atlantic Ocean, Gulf of Mexico, and Pacific Ocean. Unlike in many smaller countries, the seaside resorts in the USA are located in various climate zones, with great differences in topography and environment. Many American seaside resorts are popular destination across the world, known for their climates, culture, and entertainment opportunities.

American seaside resorts first developed near the big industrial cities on the upper East Coast like New York City, Philadelphia, and Boston. Cape May, New Jersey, and Provincetown, MA, were two of the first seaside resorts in the 1800s that catered to city workers in Philadelphia, New York and Boston. Cape May is often called Americas "first seaside resort". The early emergence of Cape May as a summer resort was due to easy transport by water from Philadelphia to the Atlantic Ocean. Early Cape May vacationers were carried to the town on sloops from Philadelphia, and water transport was also easy from New York, Baltimore, Washington, D.C. and points south. The resort business in Cape May began to thrive when regular steamboat traffic on the Delaware River began after the War of 1812. Early visitors to Cape May included Henry Clay in 1847, and Abraham Lincoln in 1849. Today, the Cape May Historic District is one of the largest and well preserved examples of Victorian architecture in the United States.

On the southern Atlantic coast, Henry Flagler had the idea to make St. Augustine, Florida a winter resort. He built several rail lines south, and combined them with existing lines to create the Florida East Coast Railway in 1885. He built a railroad bridge over the St. Johns River in 1888, opening up the Atlantic coast of Florida to development. In 1887 Flagler began construction of two large ornate hotels in St. Augustine, the 540-room Ponce de Leon Hotel and the Hotel Alcazar, and bought the Casa Monica Hotel the next year.

In Miami, Florida, the community of Cocoanut (now Coconut) Grove began development as a resort town in the 1880s with the building of the Bayview House (aka Peacock Inn) which closed in 1902. Visitors to the greater Miami area then flocked to Camp Biscayne (in Coconut Grove), the Royal Palm Hotel in Downtown Miami, and other resort hotels in Miami, as well as in smaller numbers to the Florida Keys. In 1894, the lavish Royal Poinciana Hotel opened in Palm Beach, Florida, with rave reviews from wealthy New York tourists who picked oranges in January to their delight. On the Gulf of Mexico, the City of Galveston was emerging as a booming city, and in 1882, architect Nicholas J. Clayton designed the Beach Hotel. By 1888, Galveston, TX was a wealthy city and booming seaside playground for wealthy New Orleans businessmen.

On the Pacific coast in California, in April 1886, Babcock and Story created the Coronado Beach Company, which sought to develop Coronado as a seaside resort. In the mid-1880s, the San Diego region was in the midst of one of its first real estate booms. The Hotel del Coronado was built in March 1887, with Babcock's visions for the hotel built around a courtyard of tropical trees, shrubs and flowers, with a dining wing to give full value to the view of the ocean, bay and city. By 1915, more hotels were built along the Los Angeles coastline to serve the wealthy tourists and Hollywood film makers. In May 1926, brothers E.A. "Jack" Harter and T.D. "Til" Harter built the Hotel Casa del Mar in Santa Monica, at a cost of $2 million, creating one of the most successful beach clubs in Southern California, popular with socialites and Hollywood celebrities.

In the 1920s,  Carl Fisher was the main promoter of Miami Beach, and helped to develop the city as a seaside resort. To accommodate the wealthy tourists, several grand hotels were built, among them the Flamingo Hotel. In 1926, the massive The Breakers hotel in Palm Beach had been rebuilt, and there was a large northern tourist industry in coastal southern Florida.  By the 1950s with increasing auto travel, more seaside resorts grew along the Atlantic and Pacific coasts, while small, declining industrial ports were being rebuilt. In 1954, the Fontainebleau Miami Beach, and was considered, (at that time) the most lavish seaside hotel in the world.

In the modern era, hundreds of seaside resorts now string the Gulf, Atlantic, and Pacific coasts of the United States. Many Americans move with the seasons when they visit seaside resorts, vacationing in northern seaside areas in the warm season (April through October), and then moving to southern areas in the cold season (November through March). Many seaside resorts in Florida and California however, see travelers all year.

Some examples of well-known and sought-after American coastal resort towns are:

Vietnam 
Palm Garden Resort, Hoi An

See also 
 List of beaches
Ski resort
Tourism

Notes

References

Further reading 
  — Geoghegan looks at the economy of British seaside resorts and considers a possible resurgence in their popularity.
 — Walton looks at the Victorian traditions that underpin British seaside holidays.

External links 

 
Resorts by type